Mikhail Semyonovich Tseitlin (born 16 June 1947, in Babruysk) is a Belarusian chess Grandmaster, now resident in Germany.
 
Tseitlin was twice Moscow Champion in 1976 (jointly) and 1977. His best results in international tournaments are Pernik (1977 and 1981) - 1st and 1st - 4th place; Nałęczów (1979) - 1st-3rd; Łódź (1980) - 2nd-4th; Hradec-Kralove (1982/83) - 3rd-6th; Prague (1983 and 1985) - 1st place.

Tseitlin was awarded the International Master (IM) title in 1977 and the Grandmaster (GM) title in 1987. He received the International Correspondence Chess Grandmaster title in 1990.

Books

References

External links
 
 
 
 

1947 births
Living people
People from Babruysk
Belarusian Jews
Russian Jews
Chess grandmasters
Correspondence chess grandmasters
Chess double grandmasters
Belarusian chess players
Russian chess players
Jewish chess players
Soviet chess players